The relations between the two nations mainly includes economic, diplomatic and cultural ties.

Diplomatic relations 
Kyrgyzstan has an embassy in Ashgabat and Turkmenistan has an embassy in Bishkek. Also the presidents of the mentioned countries has usual visits each other regarding to strengthening bilateral connections between Kyrgyzstan and Turkmenistan. One of those visits happened on August 23, 2018. The Kyrgyz President visited to Turkmenistan in November 2014 and the Turkmen President visited Bishkek in August 2015.

Economic relations 
In 2016, the trade turnover between Kyrgyzstan and Turkmenistan amounted to around $5.2 million which was 23.7% more compared to the statistics of last year. In 2014, the transactions between them also increased 46.3% (0.2% of total foreign trade) and it was a significant growth in comparison of the growth rate of 2013. In recent years, relations between the two countries have become more active both at the level of governments and businesses. Kyrgyzstan imports nuts, vegetable oil, polymers, propylene, fertilizers, raw sheep skins, and vegetables from Turkmenistan. In 2016, Turkmenistan has exported textiles worth $1.4 million to Kyrgyzstan.

Kyrgyzstan's main exported products to Turkmenistan included: electrical appliances, agricultural products and plastic products.

It is estimated that two Kyrgyz-Turkmen bilateral business related activities including 21 projects worth of $30 million according to the statistics of 2016 in Turkmenistan.

In Kyrgyzstan, 30 Kyrgyz-Turkmen JSCs have been registered starting from that year 11 of the total companies began to function.

In 2016, Kyrgyzstan first time exported approximately one thousand tons of beans to Turkmenistan.

Kyrgyzstan's suggestion of opening of Ashgabat—Bishkek—Ürümqi—Guangzhou flight anticipated to increase future economic ties between two nations.

Transport cooperation 
Kyrgyzstan has an interest to join the Iran–Oman–Turkmenistan–Uzbekistan international transport corridor and may become member of free trade zone.

See also 
Foreign relations of Kyrgyzstan
Foreign relations of Turkmenistan

References 

Turkmenistan
Bilateral relations of Turkmenistan